The 2010 Saskatchewan Roughriders season was the 53rd season for the team in the Canadian Football League. The Roughriders attempted to win their 4th Grey Cup championship, but they lost to the Montreal Alouettes. The Roughriders celebrated their 100th Anniversary this year, which included wearing retro black, silver and red uniforms, having a documentary made of the franchise and having the Canadian Mint release a specialized Roughrider loonie.

Offseason

Transactions

CFL draft

Preseason

Regular season

Season standings

Season schedule

Roster

Player stats

Passing

Rushing

Receiving

Awards and records

2010 CFL All-Stars
SB – Andy Fantuz
S – James Patrick

CFL Western All-Stars
 RB – Wes Cates, CFL Western All-Star
 SB – Andy Fantuz, CFL Western All-Star
 OT – Gene Makowsky, CFL Western All-Star
 OC – Jeremy O'Day, CFL Western All-Star
 LB – Barrin Simpson, CFL Western All-Star
 S – James Patrick, CFL Western All-Star

CFL Players of the Week

Source

CFL Players of the Month

Source

Milestones

Playoffs

Schedule

Bracket

West Semi-Final

West Final

98th Grey Cup Final

References

Saskatchewan Roughriders Season, 2010
Saskatchewan Roughriders seasons